Marshal of the Sri Lanka Air Force W. D. M. J.  Roshan Goonetileke, RWP and bar, VSV, USP, PhD (Hon), FIM (SL), ndc, psc is a senior officer of the Sri Lanka Air Force. The current Governor of the Western Province, Goonetileke had served as the Chief of the Defence Staff and Commander of the Sri Lankan Air Force.

He was the 12th Commander of the Sri Lanka Air Force (SLAF) and is the eldest son of the 5th Commander of the Sri Lanka Air Force, Air Chief Marshal Harry Goonatilake and the elder brother of Group Captain Shirantha Goonatilake, who was killed in action in 1995. He was the second serving service Commander to be appointed as Chief of Defence Staff whilst holding the office. Goonetileke is the most decorated officer in the history of the Sri Lanka Air Force and is held in high esteem for the role he played in ending the almost three decade long civil war that caused a lot of damaged to the country. As a result, he was bestowed upon with the honorary rank of Marshal of the Sri Lanka Air Force in 2019, the first Sri Lankan to receive this honour.

Early life
Born on 28 February 1956, to Harry Goonatilake and Marian Perera, he had a younger brother and two sisters. Goonatilake completed his education at St Peter's College, Colombo, where he excelled in both studies and sports.

Air Force career
He followed his father by joining the Sri Lanka Air Force as an Officer Cadet in the General Duties Pilot Branch on 13 January 1978. On successful completion of flying training, he was commissioned in the rank of Pilot Officer on 24 August 1979. Having logged many flying hours both in fixed and rotary wing aircraft serving as an operational pilot, he served as the Commanding Officer of No. 03 Maritime Squadron and No. 04 Helicopter Wing. He functioned as the Zonal Commander in both Northern and Eastern Zones, and commanded Air Force Bases Katunayake, Anuradhapura and China Bay. Goonetileke graduated from the Air Command and Staff College, Air University in 1994 and attended National Defence College in Pakistan in 2001. He functioned as Director Operations, Deputy Chief of Staff Operations and Chief of Staff, prior to being appointed the Commander of the Air Force on 12 July 2007. On 18 May 2009, he was promoted Air Chief Marshal, becoming the first ever serving Officer of the Sri Lanka Air Force to be promoted to four star rank. He was admitted to the Degree of Doctor of Philosophy (Honoris Causa) by the University of Kelaniya on 20 November 2009, in recognition of his professional achievements as the Commander of the Air Force. He is also a Honoury Fellow of the Institute of Management in Sri Lanka.

Chief of Defence Staff
He was appointed as Acting Chief of Defence Staff on 16 November 2009 and was confirmed as Chief of Defence Staff on 28 February 2012 upon relinquishing Command of the Sri Lanka Air Force. He was appointed Chairman Board of Management of Civil Aviation Authority of Sri Lanka (CAA of SL) with effect from 5 October 2009 until relinquishing duties on 28 December 2011. He was also appointed as Chairman of Waters Edge Ltd, a government-owned, multi-facility recreational and hospitality complex.

Personal life
Goonetileke is married to Mrs. Nelun Goonetileke. They have a son and a daughter, Rehan and Ronali. Rehan, followed the family tradition becoming a Helicopter Pilot. An avid sportsman, Goonetileke was heavily involved in the development of Sri Lanka Rugby, as the President of the Sri Lanka Rugby Football Union, serving two successful terms from 1 June 2010 to 11 January 2012.

Governor of the Western Province
He was appointed Governor of the Western Province by President Gotabaya Rajapaksa on 24 March 2020 succeeding Seetha Arambepola who resigned from the post of Governor to accept a national list appointment.

See also
 Sarath Fonseka
 Wasantha Karannagoda

References

External links
Official Website of Sri Lanka Air Force

 

1956 births
Air Command and Staff College alumni
Alumni of St. Peter's College, Colombo
Commanders of the Sri Lanka Air Force
Living people
Marshals of the Sri Lanka Air Force
Sinhalese military personnel
Sri Lanka Air Force Academy graduates
Sri Lankan Air Chief Marshals
Sri Lankan aviators